My Brief History is a memoir published in 2013 by the English physicist Stephen Hawking. The book recounts Hawking's journey from his post-war London boyhood to his years of international acclaim and celebrity.

Reception
My Brief History has received modest praise from critics.  Ian Sample of The Guardian wrote, "Hawking's memoir, My Brief History, is a skip across the surface of the Cambridge cosmologist's life, from his quirky upbringing in London and St Albans to his latest work on the beginning of time and the evolution of the universe. The details are sketched, but the brevity makes for a bold picture. Hawking's intellectual activity soars as his illness takes hold and eventually puts an intolerable burden on his marriages."  Chuck Leddy of The Boston Globe similarly observed, "It's clear, though, that Hawking is more comfortable looking up at the universe than into himself, more concerned with detailing the evolution of a career than the twists and turns of a life, though he does reveal some interesting details about his beginnings as a scientist. In clean, direct prose, Hawking leads us from his birth in Oxford in 1942 to the present."

References 

Science autobiographies
British memoirs
2013 non-fiction books
Books by Stephen Hawking
Popular physics books
Bantam Books books